Linda Reyna Yáñez (born Soila Linda Reyna, November 30, 1948) is a former American judge, Harvard Law clinical instructor and the former Regional Counsel for the Mexican American Legal Defense and Education Fund in Chicago, Illinois. She was the first Hispanic woman to serve on a Texas appeals court.

Early life 
Yáñez was born in her family home in Rio Hondo, Texas. She was raised by her grandparents while her parents traveled the country for work, occasionally working herself in local cotton fields. Yáñez was socially and academically successful, and was active in the National Honor Society and student government, though she was affected by racial discrimination in her segregated school. After high school, she enrolled in Pan American University (later the University of Texas–Pan American and now the University of Texas–Rio Grande Valley) in Edinburg, Texas.

Education 
At Pan American University, Yáñez originally planned to study engineering, but ultimately followed the Inter-American Studies program. She was a member of the Young Democrats and Model Organization for American States, and graduated with a Bachelor of Arts in 1970. After a period of time working in Washington, D.C. for then-President Richard Nixon's Committee on Opportunity for the Spanish-Speaking, and in Weslaco, Texas as a schoolteacher, Yáñez earned her Juris Doctor from Texas Southern University in Houston. She also holds a Master of Laws degree from the University of Virginia School of Law.

References 

1948 births
Living people
20th-century American judges
20th-century American women lawyers
20th-century American lawyers
21st-century American judges
Harvard Law School faculty
Hispanic and Latino American judges
People from Cameron County, Texas
Texas Southern University alumni
University of Virginia School of Law alumni
20th-century American women judges
21st-century American women judges